Bøckmann is a surname. Notable people with the surname include:

Carl Wilhelm Bøckmann Barth (1847–1919), Norwegian painter who specialized in marine art
Jacob Bøckmann Barth (1822–1892), Norwegian forester
Eduard Bøckmann (1849–1927), Norwegian American ophthalmologist, physician and inventor
Marcus Olaus Bockman (1849–1942), Norwegian-American Lutheran theologian also recorded as Marcus Olaus Bøckmann
Nils Christoffer Bøckmann (1880–1973), Norwegian lieutenant-colonel and businessperson
Peter Wilhelm Kreydahl Bøckmann (1851–1926), Norwegian bishop and theologian